Mount Ida is a  high mountain of the Continental Ranges located in Kakwa Provincial Park and Protected Area. 

The mountain is sometimes called the "Matterhorn of the North" due to its dramatic pyramidal shape and topographic prominence among the surrounding peaks.

Its closest neighbour is Edgegrain Mountain.

References 

Ida